This is a list of notable alumni and faculty of the Indian Institute of Technology, Roorkee.

Alumni

Arts 
 Lala Deen Dayal, 1866, photographer to the Viceroy of India and Nizam of Hyderabad, received the Royal Warrant from Queen Victoria in 1897

Politics 
 Papias Malimba Musafiri, former Cabinet Minister of Education (June 2015 - December 2017) in the Cabinet of Rwanda

Science and Technology 
 Amit Singhal, former senior vice president at Google
 Digvijai Singh, chemical engineer, former vice chancellor of University of Roorkee, Shanti Swarup Bhatnagar laureate
 Shyam Sundar Rai, seismologist, Shanti Swarup Bhatnagar laureate

Others 

Sudhir K. Jain (born 1959), Director, IIT Gandhinagar
Nilmani Mitra (18281894), 19th century architect, designer of several palaces in Kolkata
Henry Benedict Medlicott (18291905), Irish geologist and professor of geology
John Underwood Bateman-Champain (18351887), British army officer and engineer in India,  instrumental in laying the first electric telegraph line from Britain to India by way of the Persian Gulf
Allan Joseph Champneys Cunningham (18421928), number theorist, formulated Mersenne numbers and Fermat numbers
Charles Palmer (18471940), last surviving man to hold the Lucknow medal for his role in the defence of the Residency in Lucknow during the Indian Rebellion of 1857
Sir Ganga Ram (18511927), a leading philanthropist and agriculturist. A civil engineer by profession and a graduate of the 1873 batch, Sir Ganga Ram supervised the construction of several prominent structures in Punjab. Referred to as 'Father of modern Lahore'.
William Willcocks (18521932), British civil engineer who graduated from 1872 batch, remembered as a renowned irrigation engineer, having proposed the first Aswan Dam and undertaken major projects of irrigation in South Africa and Turkey
Baba Sawan Singh (18581948), second Satguru of Radha Soami Satsang Beas
Frederic Oscar Oertel (18621942), Indian art historian and archaeologist
S.V. Setty (18791918), The first Indian Aviator
Chaudhry Niaz Ali Khan (18801976), founder of the Dar ul Islam Movement and the Dar ul Islam Trust in South Asia and the Dar ul Islam Trust Institutes in Pathankot, India and Jauharabad, Pakistan
Ajudhiya Nath Khosla (18921984), eminent Indian engineer, educationist, visionary and recipient of second highest civilian honor of India — Padma Vibhushan, awarded in 1977, served as member of the Planning Commission, Governor of Orissa, president of National Science Academy and vice chancellor of the University of Roorkee (now IIT Roorkee)
Peter de Noronha (18971970), businessman, philanthropist, knighted by Pope Paul VI in 1965 for his work for the Christian community in India
Kanwar Sen (18991979), Chief Engineer of Bikaner credited with the creation of the Indira Gandhi canal in Rajasthan and Punjab, awarded Padma Bhushan in 1956
Ghananand Pande (19021995), chairman of Indian Railways in 1954 and chairman of Hindustan Steels, awarded the Padma Vibhushan in 1969
Jai Krishna (19121999), eminent scholar on earthquake engineering, instrumental in setting up the first and the only earthquake engineering department in India, at IIT Roorkee, awarded Padma Bhushan in 1956, served as Vice Chancellor of the University of Roorkee in 1969
Jaiprakash Gaur (born 1930), founder chairman of Jaiprakash Associates and Jaypee Group of companies, ranked by Forbes magazine as the 48th-richest person in India
A. S. Arya (born 1931), National Seismic advisor and Padma Shri awardee
G. D. Agrawal (born 1932), eminent environmental engineer, Save Ganga activist and former head of the Department of Civil and Environmental Engineering at IIT Kanpur, notable for his successful fast in 2009 to stop the damming of the Bhagirathi River
Narendra Patni (19432014), founder, chairman, and chief executive officer of Patni Computer Systems
Pradip Baijal (born 1944), IAS and former chairman Telecom Regulatory Authority of India (TRAI)
Sri Niwas, (1946–2012) geophysicist, Shanti Swarup Bhatnagar laureate
Vinita Gupta (born 1949), founder, CEO of Quick Eagle Networks and first Indian-origin-woman to take her company public
Anirudh Agarwal (born 1949), Indian character actor.
Rakesh Agrawal (born 1954), Member, National Academy of Engineering, ex-Microsoft Fellow and ex-IBM fellow widely known as the 'Father of Data Mining'
Mangu Singh (born 1955), managing director of Delhi Metro Rail Corporation Limited
Dinesh Paliwal (born 1957), president and chief executive officer of Harman International Industries
Naveen Jain (born 1959), founder and CEO of Intelius, founder of Moon Express, InfoSpace
Ajit Gupta (born 1962), founder, president, CEO of Aryaka; founder, chairman of AAyuja; founder, ex-CEO of Speedera; founder, chairman of Jantakhoj
Sumit Jain (born 1984), co-founder and CEO of Opentalk | co-founder and ex-CEO of Indian real estate portal Commonfloor.com
Harsh Gupta (born 1942), Indian earth scientist and seismologist, known for his pioneering work on estimation of reservoir-induced earthquakes.
Harshil Mathur and Shashank Kumar CEO and MD of Razorpay, USD 7.5 BN Valued,  a hugely successful payments company
Prakash Kumar Singh,former chairman of Steel Authority of India Limited

Faculty 

 Deepak Kumar, condensed matter physicist and Shanti Swarup Bhatnagar Prize recipient
 Pravindra Kumar, bioinformatician
 Vinod Kumar Gaur, seismologist and former director of the National Geophysical Research Institute

References

Indian Institute of Technology Roorkee people
IIT Roorkee
Indian Institutes of Technology people